JE Hands Memorial Park, more commonly known as Hands Oval, is a stadium in South Bunbury, Western Australia. The ground is mainly used for football matches, but has also hosted soccer and rugby union games and for a short time cricket.

Uses

Australian rules football
The oval has been the home ground of South Bunbury Football Club and in the SWFL since the early 1950s. Hands Oval has also hosted five West Australian Football League matches, with the first being held on 1 April 1984 with East Perth defeating Swan Districts by 14 points. The record attendance for the ground was set during this match, with 6573 spectators attending the game.

The ground also hosted two Fremantle Dockers pre-season NAB Challenge in 2009 and 2011:

Cricket
Hands Oval has hosted three List A cricket matches with the Western Warriors as the home team:

Soccer
Hands Oval hosted an A-League pre-season match between Perth Glory and Gold Coast United at the beginning of the 2009–10 season, with Gold Coast defeating Perth 1–0. A crowd of 2985 people attended the match:

References

West Australian Football League grounds
Multi-purpose stadiums in Australia
Sport in Bunbury, Western Australia
Sports venues in Western Australia
Cricket grounds in Australia
Sports venues completed in 1954
1954 establishments in Australia